Luca Parodi (born 6 April 1995) is an Italian football player. He plays for  club Virtus Entella.

Club career
He first was loaned by Torino to Ancona in the summer of 2014, his loan was renewed on 30 July 2015. He made his Serie C debut for Ancona on 7 September 2014 in a game against Reggiana, as a starter.

On 5 August 2016, he joined FeralpiSalò on a permanent basis. On 24 October 2017, he extended his contract until 30 June 2020.

On 31 January 2019,  he moved up to the second tier, signing with Serie B club Cittadella. He made his Serie B debut for Cittadella on 9 February 2019 in a game against Spezia, as a starter.

On 11 July 2019, he signed a 3-year contract with Ternana.

On 1 September 2020, he signed a 3-year contract with Alessandria

On 9 August 2022, Parodi joined Virtus Entella.

References

External links
 

1995 births
People from Savona
Footballers from Liguria
Living people
Italian footballers
Association football midfielders
U.S. Ancona 1905 players
FeralpiSalò players
A.S. Cittadella players
Ternana Calcio players
U.S. Alessandria Calcio 1912 players
Virtus Entella players
Serie B players
Serie C players
Sportspeople from the Province of Savona